James Kaufman (born April 1, 1949), known as Jimmy Kaufman or Jim Kaufman, is a film director, a photographer and an artist from Montreal, best known for directing the movies   Time at the Top and Whiskers, and episodes of TV series like Stargate SG-1, The Hunger and The Outer Limits (1995 TV series).   Kaufman's photography series evolves around North-American journeys, with an accent on his personal relations with nature.

Career

Early experience 

From 1971 to 1988,   Kaufman was a line producer and an assistant director for movies like The Surrogate in 1984, Children of a lesser God in 1986, and Gothika starring Halle Berry, later in 2003.
His first big success was in 1990, when he had the idea for A Star for Two, a romance movie. He was still the assistant of Elliott Gould, and on his way from New Hampshire to Boston, repatriating a Porsche for the shooting of a movie, he halted in front of a nursing home in order to help an old woman cross the street. As he tried to know more about this woman, the concept of A Star for Two started to sprout in his mind. On the other side of the Manche, Christian Bel, an ex-stuntman converted to screen writing was taking a particular interest to the movies accorded to the golden age. When he decided to answer to the tender made from   Kaufman, the movie finally took off. The concept for A Star For Two was simple: a couple meets again after a forty-year separation. She (Lauren Bacall) manages a nursing home in France, and he (Anthony Quinn) is a gerontologist in the United States. The movie was shot in France, in Montreal and in New-York, and was a success before it was even shot.

Associations 

During his career, Kaufman worked with several renowned movie producers, directors, actors and writers. In the 1990s, for instance, he collaborated with award-winning writer Duff Brenna to adapt his novel The Book of Mamie into a movie. The Book of Mamie won the AWP Best Novel award in 1988 (judged by Toby Olson). Kaufman called Brenna's screenplay one of the finest he had ever read.

Photography and Painting 
Kaufman's art photography series tell the story of his philanthropic journeys around the world and road cruises around North America. H .

Filmography

Cinema

Television movies

Television series

Video

Producer

Projects

Gallows Humor 
Currently, Jimmy Kaufman is working on a movie called Gallows Humor, a horror trilogy written by Brendan King and meant to be produced as a franchise. The idea of Gallows Humor was born after the development deal Brendan King forged with veteran producer Paul Kurta.

References

External links 
 Quebec Film Source Book; First Page, Jimmy Kaufman
 
 Vampire High Official Site, Jimmy Kaufman
 
 Hollywood.com - Urban Angel Cast and Crew; http://www.hollywood.com/tv/55458710/urban-angel

Living people
1949 births
Film directors from Montreal
Anglophone Quebec people